The Austria–Germany border has a length of  or  in the south of Germany and the north of Austria in central Europe. It is the longest border of both Austria and Germany with another country.

Route
The border runs roughly from east to west.

Besides Lake Constance, the border does not pass through any significant body of water, but it follows the Inn and Danube rivers along the eastern part.

The Austrian states of Vorarlberg, Tyrol, Salzburg, and Upper Austria run along the international border, as does the German state of Bavaria.

Tripoints

International bodies of water

Lakes

Eibelesee
Lake Constance (also borders with Switzerland)
Rannasee
Taubensee
Wöhrsee

Rivers and creeks

Aschauer
Augustinergraben
Bächteletobel
Baumgartenbach
Bayrachbach
Berchtesgadener Ache
Berndlgraben
Bolgenach
Breitach
Bächgraben
Bärnbach
Bürgerbach
Danube (Donau)
Dandlbach
Doserbach
Dürrach
Eibelebach
Eibkendlbach
Enzenbach
Eyenbach
Fermersbach
Finsterbach
Fischbach (Linder)
Fischbach (Weiße Traun)
Fugenbach
Gatterlbach
Großache
Hagenbach
Hirschbichlklausgraben
Holderbach
Hörnlebach
Hühnersbach
Inn
Isar
Kälbergernbach
Kesselbach
Kieferbach
Kleiner Bach
Kräutergrabenbach
Köhlerbach
Laublisbach
Lappbach
Lech
Lecknerbach
Leiblach
Leutasch
Lenzengraben
Littenbach
Lofer
Loisach
Markgraben
Maxenbach
Mosertalbach
Mühlbach
Naidernach
Neualmbach
Neuhäuslgraben
Pittenbach
Polusbach
Reichenauer Graben
Reichenbach
Rickenbach
Riedbach
Rißbach
Roggentalbach
Rohrmoosbach
Rothach
Roßkarbach
Saalach
Salzach with several bridges, e.g. Oberndorf-Laufen
Sandbach
Schaffitzerbach
Schanztobel
Scheidbach
Schellenbach
Schlafblassenbach
Schlawitzabach
Schwarzenbach
Schönbach
Seebach
Steinbach
Stöcklbach
Tiefengraben
Totermannbach
Unkenbach
Valepp
Vils
Walchen
Weißach
Weißbach
Wertach
Zimmerholsbach
Äuelebach

International bridges

Alte Innbrücke, Schärding - Neuhaus
Kräutelstein
Saalachbrücke Salzburg-Freilassing

International mountain ranges

Alps
Alpine foothills

International mountains

Ammer Saddle
Dürrnberg
Fellhorn
Kranzhorn
Untersberg
Zugspitze

Human settlements near the border

Freilassing  / Salzburg 
Großgmain (Salzburg (state)) 
Kufstein  / Oberaudorf 
Oberau (Berchtesgaden) 
Waidring (Kitzbühel District) 
Walserberg

International traffic

Deutsches Eck (transport link)
Inn Valley Autobahn
Schrofen Pass
Steinpass
Ursprung Pass

See also
Fiderepasshütte
Jungholz
Kleinwalsertal (enclave)
Purtschellerhaus

History
The border was confirmed in a treaty between the countries in 1972, after having been defined by a number of agreements between the Austrian Empire and the Kingdom of Bavaria in the 19th century. In 1938 the countries merged through the Anschluss. This was reverted in 1955 by the Austrian State Treaty, which re-established Austria as a sovereign state. The Schengen Area removed border controls at the border in 1997. Temporary border controls were reinstalled in 2015 in response to the European migrant crisis. These temporary border controls were scheduled to be removed on 12 May 2020, although they are liable to be extended in six-month periods.

References

External links

 Vertrag zwischen der Republik Österreich und der Bundesrepublik Deutschland über die gemeinsame Staatsgrenze in the Rechtsinformationssystem der Republik Österreich (German)

 
1972 establishments in Austria
1972 establishments in Germany
1972 in international relations
European Union internal borders
Borders of Austria
Borders of Germany
International borders